The Cry of My People is an album by avant-garde jazz saxophonist Archie Shepp released in 1972 on the Impulse! label. The album features performances by Shepp with gospel singers, big bands, quintets, sextets, and chamber orchestras. The AllMusic review by Thom Jurek states: "Shepp worked with many larger ensembles as a leader, but never did he achieve such a perfect balance as he did on The Cry of My People".

Track listing 
All compositions by Archie Shepp, except as indicated
 "Rest Enough (Song to Mother)" - 4:41  
 "A Prayer" (Cal Massey) - 6:29  
 "All God's Children Got a Home in the Universe" - 2:58  
 "The Lady" (Bob Ford) - 5:31  
 "The Cry of My People" (Massey) - 5:45  
 "African Drum Suite, Part 1" (Beaver Harris) - 0:35  
 "African Drum Suite, Part 2" (Harris) - 7:34  
 "Come Sunday" (Duke Ellington) - 9:30  
 Recorded at Allegro Sound Studios, NYC, September 25–27, 1972

Personnel 
 Archie Shepp - tenor and soprano saxophone
 Harold Mabern, Dave Burrell - piano
 Charles McGhee - trumpet
 Charles Greenlee, Charles Stephens - trombone
 Cornell Dupree - guitar
 Ron Carter - electric bass
 Jimmy Garrison - bass
 Bernard Purdie - drums
 Beaver Harris - drums
 Nene DeFense, Terry Quaye - congas, percussion, tambourine
 Guilherme Franco - berimbau, Brazilian percussion
 Peggie Blue, Joe Lee Wilson - lead vocals
 Andre Franklin, Mildred Lane, Mary Stephens, Barbara White, Judith White - backing vocals
 John Blake, Gayle Dixon, Leroy Jenkins, Lois Siessinger, Noel DeCosta, Jerry Little - violin
 Patricia Dixon, Esther Mellon - cello
 Romulus Franceschini - conductor, arranger 
 Cal Massey, Dave Burrell, Charles Greenlee - arranger, conductor

References 

1973 albums
Impulse! Records albums
Archie Shepp albums